Idanazhiyil Oru Kaalocha is a 1987 Indian Malayalam-language film written and directed by Bhadran from a story by Balachandran Chullikkad. The film stars Karthika, Vineeth, Jayabharathi and Thilakan in the lead roles. The film has musical score by V. Dakshinamoorthy.

The plot is about a college student and the problems he faced.

Cast
Vineeth as Ananth
Jayabharathi
Karthika as Abhirami
Thilakan
Adoor Bhasi
Ashokan
Sankaradi
Kakka Ravi
M. G. Soman
Paravoor Bharathan

Soundtrack
The music was composed by V. Dakshinamoorthy and the lyrics were written by O. N. V. Kurup and Traditional.

References

External links
 

1987 films
1980s Malayalam-language films
Films directed by Bhadran